The Compositions World Tour was a concert tour in 1990 by American recording artist Anita Baker in support of her Platinum selling album Compositions. The tour was to kick off in early May with four sold-out shows at the Sunrise Music Theatre in Miami, Florida. The dates where soon cancelled due to Baker becoming vocally ill the prior week before the scheduled shows. The tour resumed in late May with dates scheduled in North America, Europe and Asia. Baker performed four-consecutive shows in various cities in North America, which included Merrillville, Indiana and Miami, Florida.

Opening acts
Pamela A Smith

Set list
"Sweet Love"
"Been So Long"
"Mystery"
"No One in the World"
"Same Ole Love (365 Days of Year)"
"Giving You the Best That I Got"
"Angel"1
"Rules"
"Good Enough"
"Lonely"
"No One to Blame"
"Soul Inspiration"1
"You Bring Me Joy"
"Caught Up in the Rapture"
Encore
"Fairy Tales"
"Talk to Me"

1 performed on select dates in North America

Additional notes
During the tour, in select cities, Baker's encore was either "Talk to Me" or "Fairy Tales", or both songs were performed.

Band
 Music Director/Guitar: Ray Fuller
 Keyboards: Darrell Smith
 Drums: Rayford Griffin
 Bass guitar: Larry Kimpel
 Keyboards: Donn Wyatt
 Saxophone: Everette Harp
 Background vocals: Perri Sisters

Tour dates

Notes

 Not all concerts dates are listed in North America and Europe.

References

External links
 www.AnitaBaker.com

1990 concert tours
Anita Baker concert tours